French Foreign Legion may refer to:

Military
 Foreign Legion (Légion étrangère), modern France
 1st Foreign Legion (France), Kingdom of France
 2nd Foreign Legion (France), Kingdom of France

Other uses
 French Foreign Legion (song), 1958 song

See also
 List of French Foreign Legion units
 History of the French Foreign Legion
 French Foreign Legion Veteran Societies Federation
 French Foreign Legion in popular culture
 French Legion, several organisations
 Foreign legion (disambiguation)

Disambiguation pages